Sweetwater or Sweet Water may refer to:
 Freshwater

Places

In the United States
 Sweet Water, Alabama
 Sweetwater, Arizona
 Sweetwater River (California), San Diego County
 Sweetwater Dam, a dam across the Sweetwater River
 Sweetwater Reservoir, an artificial lake, formed by the Sweetwater Dam
 Sweetwater Mountains a small mountain range in California and western Nevada
 Sweetwater Formation, a geologic stratigraphic formation in California
 Sweetwater, Miami-Dade County, Florida
 Sweetwater, Duval County, Florida, a place in Florida
 Sweetwater Ranch, Florida, an unincorporated community in Hardee County
 Sweetwater, Liberty County, Florida, a place in Florida
 Sweet Water, Illinois
 Sweetwater, Idaho
 Sweetwater, Missouri
 Sweetwater, Nebraska
 Sweetwater, Nevada
 Sweetwater, New Jersey
 Sweetwater, Oklahoma
 Sweetwater, Tennessee
 Sweetwater, Texas
 Sweetwater Swatters, a baseball team based in Sweetwater, Texas
 Sweetwater County, Wyoming
 Sweetwater River (Wyoming)
 Sweetwater Township, Michigan
 Sweetwater Township, Clay County, North Carolina

Elsewhere
 Sweetwater, London, a town to be built on the site of Olympic Park, London

Film and television
 Sweetwater (2023 film), an American sports biographical film
 Sweetwater (2013 film), an American western film
 Sweetwater (1983 film), an American film starring Diane Ladd
 Sweetwater (1988 film), a Norwegian film starring Petronella Barker
 Sweetwater, a fictional ranch in Once Upon a Time in the West
 Sweetwater, a fictional town in Westworld

Literature 
 Sweetwater, 1973 novel by Laurence Yep
 Sweetwater, 1976 novel by Knut Faldbakken
 The Sweetwater, 1976 novel by Jean Rikhoff
 Sweetwater, a character in At Heaven's Gate by Robert Penn Warren
 Ned Sweetwater, a character in the Mandie series by Lois Gladys Leppard

Music
 Sweetwater (band), a 1960s band
 Sweetwater (album)
 Sweet Water (band), a 1990s American band
 Sweet Water (album)
 Sweetwater Sound, a music equipment retailer
 Sweetwaters Music Festival, a festival in New Zealand

Schools
 Sweet Water High School, Sweet Water, Alabama
 Sweetwater High School (National City, California)
 Sweetwater Union High School District, California
 Sweetwater City Schools, a school district of Sweetwater, Tennessee
 Sweetwater Independent School District, Sweetwater, Texas
 Sweetwater County School District Number 1, Wyoming
 Sweetwater County School District Number 2, Wyoming

Other uses 
 Sweetwater (grape) or Chasselas, a grape varietal
 SweetWater Brewing Company a brewery in Atlanta, Georgia
 Sweetwater Brewery, a brewery in Green River, Wyoming
 Sweetwater Casino, a casino in Mullica Township, New Jersey
 Sweetwater Inn, an inn in McDuffie County, Georgia
 Sweetwater Mansion, a plantation house in Florence, Alabama 
 Nathaniel Clifton or Sweetwater (1922–1990), American basketball player
 Sweet Water, a fictional ruined city in Might and Magic VI: The Mandate of Heaven
Sweetwater Dam Naval Outlying Landing Field

See also 
 Cordry Sweetwater Lakes, Indiana
 Sewickley, Pennsylvania, translated as Sweetwater
 Sweetwater Canal (disambiguation)
 Sweetwater Creek (disambiguation)
 Sweetwater River (disambiguation)